Chen Wei or Wei Chen may refer to:

People surnamed Chen 
Wei Chen (engineer), Chinese-American mechanical engineer
Chen Wei (food scientist) (born 1966), Chinese food scientist
Chen Wei (medical scientist) (born 1966), Chinese epidemiologist
Chen Wei (politician) (born 1966), Chinese politician
Chen Wei (dissident) (born 1969), Chinese dissident and human rights activist
Wei Chen (journalist), Canadian television and radio journalist
Chen Wei (artist) (born 1980), Chinese artist
Chen Wei (baseball) (born 1983), baseball pitcher
Chen Wei (footballer, born 1993), Chinese footballer for Shanghai Shenxin
Chen Wei (footballer, born 1998), Chinese footballer for Shanghai SIPG
Chen Da Wei, Chinese violinist

People surnamed Wei 
Vision Wei (born 1986), Chinese pop singer

See also
 Wei (disambiguation)
 Chen (disambiguation)